Syncosmia discisuffusa is a moth in the family Geometridae. It is found on Borneo.

The wings are dark, pale brownish yellow fasciated with dark brown.

References

Moths described in 1976
Eupitheciini